Xingshan may refer to the following locations in China:

Xingshan County (兴山县), of Yichang, Hubei
Xingshan District (兴山区), Hegang, Heilongjiang
Xingshan, Majiang County (杏山镇), town in Qiandongnan Miao and Dong Autonomous Prefecture, Guizhou
Xingshan, Shuangcheng (杏山镇), town in Heilongjiang
Xingshan Township, Longjiang County (杏山乡), Heilongjiang
Xingshan Township, Lishu County (杏山乡), Jilin